Sabie is a surname. Notable people with the surname include:

Camille Sabie (1902–1998), American athlete
Francis Sabie (fl. 1595), English poet